"Drinkin' and Dreamin'" is a song written by Troy Seals and Max D. Barnes, and recorded by American country music artist Waylon Jennings.  It was released in June 1985 as the first single from the album Turn the Page.  The song reached No. 2 on the Billboard Hot Country Singles & Tracks chart.

Charts

Weekly charts

Year-end charts

References

1985 singles
1985 songs
Waylon Jennings songs
Songs written by Max D. Barnes
Songs written by Troy Seals
RCA Records singles
Songs about alcohol